DXRE (837 AM) Sonshine Radio is a radio station owned and operated by Sonshine Media Network International. The station's studio is located in Brgy. Lagao, General Santos.

References

Radio stations in General Santos
Radio stations established in 1971
Sonshine Media Network International
News and talk radio stations in the Philippines